Zvonko Jakovljević (born 30 January 1996) is a Serbian footballer who plays for Bačka 1901, on loan from Serbian SuperLiga club Spartak Subotica.

Club career

Spartak Subotica
He made his Jelen SuperLiga debut for Spartak Subotica on away match versus Radnički Niš on 10 May 2014.

References

External links
 
 Zvonko Jakovljević Stats at utakmica.rs 
 

Living people
1996 births
Serbian footballers
FK Spartak Subotica players
FK Senta players
FK Bačka 1901 players
Serbian SuperLiga players
Association football forwards